Sam Kilburn (16 October 1868 – 25 September 1940) was an English first-class cricketer, who played one match for Yorkshire County Cricket Club, against Essex at Bradford Park Avenue, in 1896.

References

External links
Cricinfo Profile

1868 births
1940 deaths
Yorkshire cricketers
Cricketers from Huddersfield
English cricketers
English cricketers of 1890 to 1918